Wojsko kwarciane (quarter army) was the term used for regular army units of Poland (Polish–Lithuanian Commonwealth). The term was used since 1562.

Wojsko kwarciane was formed from earlier obrona potoczna units.

The term "quarter" in the name of the army comes from the type of the tax paid for their upkeep (kwarta tax): a quarter of income from the crown lands (królewszczyzny) was supposed to be used for that purpose. As monarchs usually leased their land to szlachta (or merchants, or Jews) for short-term benefits, they didn't have direct control over cash flow and this often resulted in corruption and delayed payment of military wages. Military commanders (hetmans) often had to pay the wages of wojsko kwarciane and hired mercenaries from their own purse. Sometimes disgruntled unpaid units formed confederations (see konfederacja) in order to lawfully collect their wages by force.

The standing numbers of wojsko kwarciane varied by peacetime and wartime. On average during peacetime the army totalled about 2500 cavalry.

It was a relatively small standing army when compared with other contemporary countries, especially considering the Commonwealth's huge area. Commonwealth armies would almost always be stretched thin to defend its territory from its aggressive neighbours of (Sweden, Russia, the Ottoman Empire and its  vassals).

In 1632 new quarter or royal taxes (dupla) was created to pay for artillery units.

In 1652 wosko kwarciane was replaced with wojsko komputowe.

See also 
 
 piechota wybraniecka (piechota łanowa)
 pospolite ruszenie

Military history of the Polish–Lithuanian Commonwealth